is a stealth video game developed by Acquire and released for the PlayStation 2 in 2006.

A remastered version of the game, titled Kamiwaza: Way of the Thief, was released in October 2022 for Microsoft Windows, Nintendo Switch, and PlayStation 4 via Acquire in Japan and NIS America in North America and Europe. Metacritic listed Kamiwaza: Way of the Thief as the ninth-worst game of 2022.

Notes

References

External links 
 

2006 video games
PlayStation 2 games
Stealth video games
Video games developed in Japan
Acquire (company) games
Single-player video games
Video games about crime